Grandview Township is a township in Ford County, Kansas, USA.  As of the 2000 census, its population was 784.

Geography
According to the USGS, it contains one cemetery, Pleasant Vale.

The streams of Duck Creek, Elm Creek and South Fork Duck Creek run through this township.

Transportation
Grandview Township contains one airport or landing strip, Wilroads Gardens Airport.

References
 USGS Geographic Names Information System (GNIS)

External links
 US-Counties.com
 City-Data.com

Townships in Ford County, Kansas
Townships in Kansas